Emil Lerp (1 January 1886 – 1 January 1966) was a German businessman and inventor of the first mass produced transportable gasoline chainsaw.

Career 
Lerp was born in Goldbach, Saxe-Coburg and Gotha in 1886. In 1927, he invented the transportable gasoline chainsaw. Lerp tested his invention on a hill called Dolmar, and named his company after the testing site. On 15 June 1928, Lerp received a patent in Germany for his invention. His former business partner Andreas Stihl founded the German company Stihl which also makes chainsaws.

References

External links 
 dolmarpowerproducts.com
 Welt.de: Großes Herz für Forstarbeiter (German)

1886 births
1966 deaths
People from Gotha (district)
People from Saxe-Coburg and Gotha
20th-century German inventors